John Hayward (born before 1530 – died by 1572), of Dorchester, Dorset, was an English politician.

He was a Member (MP) of the Parliament of England for Dorchester in 1558.

References

Year of death missing
English MPs 1558
Members of the Parliament of England for Dorchester
Year of birth uncertain